Choi Yuen Estate is a public housing estate in Sheung Shui, New Territories, Hong Kong, near Landmark North and MTR Sheung Shui station. It is the first public housing estate in North District and consists of six residential buildings completed between 1981 and 1983.

Yuk Po Court and Choi Po Court are Home Ownership Scheme courts in Sheung Shui near Choi Yuen Estate, built in 1982 and 1984 respectively.

Background
The site of Choi Yuen Estate was formerly occupied by vegetable farms and the nearby village was called Tsoi Yuen Tsuen, which meant Vegetable Farm Village in Chinese. In the 1970s, the vegetable farms were removed to construct Choi Yuen Estate; "菜園村" and "彩園邨" sound almost the same except the tone of the character "菜" / "彩". In the 1990s, the village was demolished to build Landmark North, one of the largest shopping malls in North District.

Houses

Choi Yuen Estate

Yuk Po Court

Choi Po Court

Demographics
According to the 2016 by-census, Choi Yuen Estate had a population of 12,178, Yuk Po Court had a population of 3,238 while Choi Po Court had a population of 4,816. Altogether the population amounts to 20,232.

Politics
For the 2019 District Council election, the estate fell within two constituencies. Choi Yuen Estate and Choi Po Court are located in the Choi Yuen constituency, which is represented by Lam Tsz-king until July 2021, while Yuk Po Court falls within the Shek Wu Hui constituency, which was formerly represented by Lam Cheuk-ting until March 2021.

See also

Public housing estates in Sheung Shui

References

Sheung Shui
Public housing estates in Hong Kong
Housing estates with centralized LPG system in Hong Kong